The  is a strait between the islands of Amami Ōshima and Kakeromajima in Japan. It is part of the Amami Guntō National Park. From the western most side to the eastern most side of the strait, the strait measures 17.5 miles (28.2 km) long.

Ferry lines 
There are 5 ferry lines that go through the strait. Each of them depart from the Setonami port in Amami Oshima island. These ferry lines operate often as transportation between these ports are very popular.

References

Straits of Japan